Actias is a genus of Saturniid moths, which contains the Asian-American moon moths. Long tails on their hindwings are among their distinctive traits. Other moths with similar appearance are Copiopteryx, Argema and Eudaemonia.

The majority of species in this genus feed on the leaves of sweetgum, pine, or similar trees. As with all Saturniids, adult Actias moths lack functional mouthparts so their lifespan after emergence from the cocoon only ranges from a few days to a week.

Species
The genus includes the following species:

Actias aliena (Butler, 1879)
Actias angulocaudata Naumann & Bouyer, 1998
Actias apollo Röber, 1923
Actias artemis (Bremer & Gray, 1853)
Actias arianeae (Brechlin, 2007)
Actias australovietnama Brechlin, 2000
Actias brevijuxta Nässig & Treadaway, 1997
Actias callandra Jordan, 1911 – Andaman moon moth
Actias chapae Mell, 1950
Actias chrisbrechlinae (Brechlin, 2007)
Actias dubernardi (Oberthür, 1897) – Chinese luna moth
Actias dulcinea (Butler, 1881) – Sweetheart moon moth
Actias felicis (Oberthür, 1896)
Actias gnoma (Butler, 1877) – Japanese moon moth
Actias groenendaeli Roepke, 1954
Actias guangxiana Brechlin, 2012
Actias ignescens Moore, 1877
Actias isis Sonthonnax, 1897
Actias kongjiara Chu & Wang, 1993
Actias keralana 
Actias laotiana Testout, 1936
Actias luna (Linnaeus, 1758) – Luna moth
Actias maenas (Doubleday, 1847) – Malaysian moon moth
Actias neidhoeferi Ong & Yu, 1968
Actias ningpoana Fielder, 1862 – Chinese moon moth
Actias parasinensis Brechlin, 2009
Actias philippinica Naessig & Treadaway, 1997
Actias rasa Brechlin & Saldaitis, 2016
Actias rhodopneuma Roeber, 1925– Pink spirit moth 
Actias rosenbergii (Kaup, 1895)
Actias seitzi Kalis, 1934
Actias selene (Hübner, 1806) – Indian moon moth
Actias shaanxiana (Brechlin, 2007) 
Actias sinensis (Walker, 1855) – South China moon moth
Actias truncatipennis (Sonthonnax, 1899)
Actias uljanae (Brechlin, 2007)
Actias vanschaycki Brechlin, 2013
Actias winbrechlini (Brechlin, 2007)
Actias witti (Brechlin, 2007)
Actias xenia Jordan, [1912]

Selected former species
Actias heterogyna (Kishida, 1993)
Actias isabellae (Graells, 1849)
Actias omeishana Watson, 1912

Galleries

Eggs

1st Instar

2nd Instar

3rd Instar

4th Instar

5th Instar

Cocoon

Adult

References

 RightHealth

 
Saturniinae
Moth genera
Taxa named by William Elford Leach